Deborah Scroggins (November 27, 1961 in Atlanta, Georgia) is an American journalist and author. A graduate of Tulane University and Columbia University, she was a reporter and editor for the Atlanta Journal-Constitution from 1987 to 1998. Her book Emma's War: An Aid Worker, Radical Islam and the Politics of Oil - A True Story of Love and Death in the Sudan is about Emma McCune, a British aid worker who married Sudanese warlord Riek Machar.  It won the 2003 Ron Ridenhour Award for Truth-Telling.  Director Tony Scott had planned to direct a film based on the book and initial reports indicated that Nicole Kidman would star as McCune.<ref>Tom Anderson, The Independent, March 27, 2005</ref>  The project was in development at the time of Scott's death in 2012; its fate following Scott's death remains unclear.

Scroggins has also written a second book: Wanted Women: Faith, Lies, and the War on Terror: The Lives of Ayaan Hirsi Ali and Aafia Siddiqui, an examination of the militant Islam movement through the lives of two women on opposite sides of the spectrum: Ayaan Hirsi Ali and Aafia Siddiqui.

References

External links
 Bio and articles from The Nation Ridenhour Prize bio
 
 SIPA Alumna Deborah Scroggins Wins Ron Ridenhour Truth-telling Award, Columbia News''

1961 births
Living people
Writers from Atlanta
American women journalists
Columbia University alumni
20th-century American journalists
20th-century American women
21st-century American women